A Bhutanese passport is a document that authorises and facilitates travel and other activities in Bhutan or by Bhutanese citizens. Foreign travel passports are issued to citizens of Bhutan for international travel by the Ministry of Foreign Affairs. It is valid for all countries unless otherwise endorsed.

History 

In the Kingdom of Bhutan, which constitutes a part of modern-day Bhutan, feudal passbooks or dzeng (Dzongkha: ཛེང) were issued to court messengers in order to travel from kingdom to kingdom. Diplomacy and mediating were crucially important measures in pre-modern Bhutan chiefdoms.

Foreign travel passports are issued to citizens of Bhutan for international travel. New Bhutanese passports are issued by the foreign affairs.

In 1988, Bhutanese passport holders abroad were ordered to surrender their passports upon their return to Bhutan.

In approximately 2006, the current version of the Bhutanese passports were first issued.

Languages
The passport contains text in English and Dzongkha (Tibetan script).

Types of passport

See also

 List of passports
 Visa policy of Bhutan
 Visa requirements for Bhutanese citizens
 Bhutanese Citizenship Act 1985

References

External links
 Bhutanese Ministry of Foreign Affairs

Bhutan
Passport